Yeimar Pastor Gómez Andrade (born 30 June 1992) is a Colombian professional footballer who plays as a defender for Major League Soccer club Seattle Sounders FC.

Club career
Gómez made his professional debut for Tiro Federal while on loan from Rosario Central. He made 66 appearances in two and a half seasons with Unión de Santa Fe.

On February 5, 2020, Gómez signed with Seattle Sounders FC of Major League Soccer.

International career
Gómez made his debut for the Colombia national team on 16 January 2022 in a 2–1 home win over Honduras.

Career statistics

Honours
Seattle Sounders FC
CONCACAF Champions League: 2022

Individual
MLS All-Star: 2021
MLS Best XI: 2021

References

External links
 
 

1992 births
Living people
Sportspeople from Chocó Department
Colombian footballers
Association football defenders
Argentine Primera División players
Primera Nacional players
Torneo Argentino A players
Rosario Central footballers
Tiro Federal footballers
Arsenal de Sarandí footballers
Independiente Rivadavia footballers
Unión de Santa Fe footballers
Major League Soccer players
Seattle Sounders FC players
Colombian expatriate footballers
Expatriate footballers in Argentina
Expatriate soccer players in the United States
Colombian expatriate sportspeople in Argentina
Colombian expatriate sportspeople in the United States
Colombia international footballers